Dietrich Bahner (8 June 1939 – 21 May 2009) was a German politician of the Christian Democratic Union (CDU) and former member of the German Bundestag.

Life 
Bahner had been a member of the CDU since 1971, one year later he was chairman of the local association in Berlin-Wedding. In 1973 and 1974 he was deputy chairman of the Junge Union Berlin. He was both the district chairman of the CDU in Berlin-Wedding and a member of the federal board of the CDU's economic council. From 1975 to 1979, he was a member of the Berlin House of Representatives, where he resigned to replace Jürgen Wohlrabe in the Bundestag on 12 September 1979. In the 1980 federal elections, he was again sent to the Bundestag as a Berlin member of parliament. He was a member of the Committee on Petitions and the Committee on Labour and Social Affairs.

Literature

References

1939 births
2009 deaths
Members of the Bundestag for Berlin
Members of the Bundestag 1980–1983
Members of the Bundestag 1976–1980
Members of the Bundestag for the Christian Democratic Union of Germany